Sar Seyl-e Zardab-e Mohammad Taher (also Romanized as Sar Seyl-e Zardāb-e Moḩammad Ţāher; also known as Sar Seyl-e Zardābeh-ye Moḩammad Ţāher) is a village in Qilab Rural District, Alvar-e Garmsiri District, Andimeshk County, Khuzestan Province, Iran. At the 2006 census, its population was 192, in 32 families.

References 

Populated places in Andimeshk County